Actrix dissimulatrix is a species of snout moth in the genus Actrix. It was described by Carl Heinrich in 1956. It is found in North America, including the type location of Virginia.

References

Moths described in 1956
Phycitinae
Moths of North America